Fenoprop, also called 2,4,5-TP, is the organic compound 2-(2,4,5-trichlorophenoxy)propionic acid. It is a phenoxy herbicide and a plant growth regulator, an analog of 2,4,5-T in which the latter's acetic acid sidechain is replaced with a propionate group (with an extra CH3). The addition of this extra methyl group creates a chiral centre in the molecule and useful biological activity is found only in the (2R)-isomer. The compound's mechanism of action is to mimic the growth hormone indoleacetic acid (IAA). When sprayed on plants it induces rapid, uncontrolled growth. As with 2,4,5-T, fenoprop is toxic to shrubs and trees.

The name Silvex was used in the USA but it has been banned from use there since 1985. According to the Environmental Protection Agency its greatest use was as a postemergence herbicide for control of woody plants, and broadleaf herbaceous weeds in rice and bluegrass turf, in sugarcane, in rangeland improvement programs and on lawns.
Fenoprop and some of its esters were in use from 1945 but are now obsolete.

See also 

 Phenoxy herbicides
 2,4,5-Trichlorophenoxyacetic acid

References 

Auxinic herbicides
Carboxylic acids
Chlorobenzenes
Phenol ethers